Zbigniew Pocialik (1 June 1945 – 27 December 2020) was a Polish professional footballer who played as a goalkeeper for KS Warszawianka, Gwardia Warsaw, Beveren and Polonia Bydgoszcz.

References

1945 births
2020 deaths
Polish footballers
KS Warszawianka players
Gwardia Warsaw players
K.S.K. Beveren players
Polonia Bydgoszcz players
Ekstraklasa players
Association football goalkeepers
Polish expatriate footballers
Polish expatriates in Belgium
Expatriate footballers in Belgium